Tejgaon Railway Station is a railway station in Bangladesh located in Tejgaon Thana, Dhaka District.

Structures 
The station has a platform. The platform is open from almost all sides. There is a 15-seat restroom (second class) for passengers. There are a total of three ticketing counters, two for men and one for women and passengers with special needs.

Criticism 
Tejgaon railway station is often criticized for its poor infrastructure, lack of adequate manpower, polluted environment and lack of security. According to media reports, most of the robberies on moving trains occur in the Tejgaon railway station area.

Accident 
 6 October 2019: A Noakhali-bound train from Dhaka derailed near Tejgaon railway station at 4:40 pm (UTC+6). However, there were no casualties.

References

External link 
 
 

Railway stations in Dhaka District
Railway stations opened in 1895
1895 establishments in British India